Acaenica is a monotypic moth genus of the family Noctuidae. Its only species, Acaenica diaperas, is found in Mozambique where the type specimen was found on Mount Chiperone. Both the genus and species were first described by George Hampson in 1918.

References

Endemic fauna of Mozambique
Acontiinae
Monotypic moth genera
Noctuoidea genera
Moths of Africa